The Friendship Order is a service award conferred by the Government of Vietnam for "foreigners and on collectives of foreigners that have made great contributions to building, consolidating and developing the friendship between Vietnam and other countries in the world."

The Friendship Order shall be conferred or posthumously conferred on foreigners and foreign organizations meet the following criteria:

 A spirit of solidarity and friendship, mutual respect for sovereignty, laws and customs of Vietnam.
 There are important contributions to the construction and economic development - social, security and defense of Vietnam, has many merits in strengthening and developing relations of friendship and good cooperation on the politics, economics, defense, security, diplomatic, scientific, technological, environmental protection, culture and society between Vietnam and other countries and regional and inter-regional foreign institutions, international organizations.

Recipients

 Coach Park Hang-seo, 2018
 Chinese Ambassador Hong Xiaoyong, 2018
 Italian Ambassador Cecilia Piccioni, 2018
Dr Joël Leroy, Surgeon, 2017
 Saber Hossain Chowdhury
Asian Institute of Technology
 German journalist Hellmut Kapfenberger 
Subinay Nandy, Deputy Resident Representative, United Nations Development Programme (UNDP), 2007
Vojtěch Filip, chairman of the Communist Party of Bohemia and Moravia

 Carlo Urbani, Italian Doctor, 2003, for identifying severe acute respiratory syndrome (SARS) and issuing an early warning to the World Health Organization

See also 
 Vietnam awards and decorations

References

 
Orders, decorations, and medals of Vietnam
Military awards and decorations of Vietnam
Awards established in 2003
2003 establishments in Vietnam